Rene Mandri (born 20 January 1984 in Jõgeva) is an Estonian former professional road bicycle racer, who competed as a professional between 2006 and 2012, with the ,  and  teams. He has been working as cycling coach since 2014 and he is a recognized Sports Organisation Leader with an IOC diploma. He created Cycling Tartu, a club to develop cycling in the Baltics.

He now works as the team manager for UCI Continental team .

Major results

2005
 1st  Time trial, National Under-23 Road Championships
2006
 1st Trophée Luc Leblanc
 2nd Road race, UEC European Under-23 Road Championships
2011
 2nd Overall Tour de Bretagne
1st Stage 2
 2nd Tartu GP
2012
 1st Tartu GP
 1st Stage 3 Vuelta Ciclista a León
2013
 3rd Overall Rhône-Alpes Isère Tour
 5th Overall Baltic Chain Tour

References

External links 

 
Rene Mandri at Rattaprofid 

1984 births
Living people
Sportspeople from Jõgeva
Estonian male cyclists
Cyclists at the 2012 Summer Olympics
Olympic cyclists of Estonia